In mathematics, the Gevrey classes on a domain , introduced by Maurice Gevrey, are spaces of functions 'between' the space of analytic functions  and the space of smooth (infinitely differentiable) functions .

Where  denotes the partial derivative of order  (see multi-index notation).

When ,  coincides with the class of analytic functions , but for  there are compactly supported functions in the class that are not identically zero (an impossibility in ).

Application 

Gevrey functions are used in control engineering for trajectory planning.
 
A typical example is the function 

with 

and Gevrey order

See also

Denjoy–Carleman theorem

References

Smooth functions